Dulduityn Danzanravjaa (1803–1856) was a prominent Mongolian writer, composer, painter, Buddhist scholar, physician and the fifth Noyon Khutagt, the Lama of the Gobi. His name is a Mongolian adaptation of the last part of the Tibetan name Lobsang Tenzin Rabgye given to Danzanravjaa by the fourth Bogd Gegeen on his visit to the Mongolian capital, Urga (present-day Ulaanbaatar), in 1812 – where Danzanravjaa was also recognized as an Incarnate Lama (Tib: Tulku). There are several versions concerning the origins and use of "Dulduityn". He was the fifth incarnation of the Gobi Noyon Khutagt, which is the title of a prominent line of tulkus of the Nyingmapa lineage of Tibetan Buddhism in Mongolia and was found by the personal attendant of the fourth Noyon Khutagt in 1809. It was not possible to enthrone Danzanravjaa as the fifth Noyon Hutagt because of the ban from the ruling Manchu (Qing) dynasty on recognition of this line of incarnations. Mongolia at the time was under Manchurian Qing control. He was enthroned as the Avshaa Gegeen in Ongiin Gol (present-day Saikhan-Ovoo. Dundgovi) Monastery by Ishdonilhudev Rinpoche. He is primarily famous for his poetry, but is also known for his prophecies, and treatises on medicine, philosophy, and astrology.

Life
Danzanravjaa was born in the Tüsheet Khan aimag's Gobi Mergen khoshuu, in what is today Khövsgöl sum of Dornogovi aimag on 25th day of mid winter month by lunar calendar. His family was poor, and his mother died while he was still young. He and his father survived by begging and singing until 1809, when he was accepted as a disciple of Ishdoniilhundev Rinpoche at Ongiin Monastery where the boy received the name of Luvsandanzanravja and the vows of a Buddhist layman. From an early age he showed much talent for music and poetry, wrote his first famous impromptu Khurmast Tenger (the Heavens) at age of seven. The literary and oratorical abilities in the boy, made the locals to believe he was a reincarnation of saints so they appealed to the higher clergy for recognition of his next incarnation. While studying at the monastery, the boy showed himself brilliantly, and in 1811 was publicly recognized by his spiritual advisor Ishdoniilhundev as the reincarnation of the geshe Navaana, or the Asvaa-gegen. The identity of the incarnation was confirmed by Palden Tenpai Nyima, 7th Panchen Lama and Janjah-hutuhta IV Yeshe Tenpay Gyaltsen; In Urga (present day Ulaanbaatar), Danzanravjaa was introduced to Bogd Gegeen IV, theocratic leader of the country, who granted him the title of "Brave" (chin zorigt) and the right to use certain status items. 
In 1817, Danzanravjaa moved to the Dolnuur monastery, where he studied for three years. His curriculum included various Buddhist and medical teachings and also the work of the Tibetan poet Rompo Calden Gyatso. He received tantric initiations in the monasteries Choyling and Badgar during this time.

After finishing the course of traditional Buddhist education in 1820, Danzanravjaa founded the monasteries Khamar Monastery (Uver-Bajasgalant), Choylogiin and Burdeni, which became the centers of culture, art and education. In 1821, he founded the Lamrim datsan at Khamaryn monastery where he taught his scholastic ideas, in 1822 - the temple of Labran, in 1823 – the temple of Agvaa and the temple devoted to fierce deities – protectors, and in 1827 the Kalachakra temple

In 1840s, Danzanravjaa founded a number of monasteries throughout the Gobi region of Mongolia (now some of them are located in Inner Mongolia), for example, the Three Monasteries of Mount Galbyn (Ulaan-Sahiusnii, Tsagaan-tolgoin and Demchigiin) in modern-day Khanbogd, Ömnögovi. He personally took part in the development of architectural projects for these construction projects.

Many monasteries he established became religious and cultural centers and served as religious crossroads between Mongolia, China, and Tibet during his lifetime. Other than his writings, he was also known for his syncretic combination of Yellow Hat and Red Hat sect beliefs. As a member of the Nyingma school of Buddhism, Danzanravjaa was not required to refrain from alcohol or sexual intimacy, and he was well known for his love of both. He frequently referred to the ecstasy he experienced with his lovers and took two wives. He also referred to himself as a "boozer" (sokhtakhu) in his writing.

Danzanravjaa paid special attention to Khamar Monastery which he founded, where in addition to the buildings standard to the Mongolian Buddhist monastery, he organized:
 a theater called Saran Khukhuu (Moon Cuckoo) in 1832 which was called "datsan of describing lives" with a touring troupe. The plays were a combination of songs, dance and story telling in the comedic and melodramatic genres that Danzanravjaa personally staged based on the Mongolian choreography and ceremonies as well as foreign drama elements.
 a public library and museum in 1840 at so-called the "exhibition temple" (Givaadin Ravjaalin). This temple housed about ten thousand items including Buddhist teaching works, theatrical works, his personal art works, tankas as well as gifts from Mongolian and foreign lords and officials and various curious things he collected during his many domestic and foreign trips. In the public library, visitors could regularly listen to specially trained readers reciting books aloud. 
 a general education school for children. His school called the "children's datsan" represented the opportunity for children, boys and girls alike, regardless of their social origin, to master the educational program – Mongolian and Tibetan language and literature, mathematics, natural science, history, music and dance. Graduates of the school received a stamped certificate of education, and often went on to work in the theater company  as actors, singers, costumers and decorators as well as teachers at the school.

Death
Danzanravjaa died under mysterious circumstances. It is often claimed that he was murdered by poisoning, which is possible since he had many enemies during his lifetime. He was unpopular with the Manchu rulers of the Qing dynasty and the widow of a local ruler. However, there is no definitive evidence that his death was from murder, suicide, or simply illness.

Legacy
After Danzan's death one of his disciples, Sh. Balchinchoijoo (Ishlodon), collected his manuscripts and relics and served as their curator (Takhilch), a role that passed down to his male heirs. After the communist revolution the collection was buried for safekeeping in the mountains, and a map to the location continued to pass within the family of Curators. The collection remained buried until the present curator, Zundoi Altangerel, unearthed 24 boxes of manuscripts and relics in 1991 and transferred them to a small museum in Sainshand. Another 22 boxes remained buried. In 2009, Altangerel and Austrian archaeologist Michael Eisenriegler unearthed two more crates in an event that was simulcast on the Internet on TV.

In 2005 a digital archive of his original work was created with funding from the British Library's Endangered Archives Programme. It consists of 43,350 TIFF files. The project remains incomplete, however, since a number of the crates have been loaned out and not returned.

Bibliography 

There are over 300 poems, 100 songs, numerous religious paintings, and a variety of Buddhist, philosophical, medical and astronomical treatises, theses and monographs written by Danzanravjaa in Tibetan and Mongolian, of which 170 works in Mongolian and over 180 in Tibetan have survived to this day in full text and are now housed at the National Archives of Mongolia, Danzanravjaa Museum, archives of National University of Mongolia and several other institutions.  
 
Danzanravjaa's poetry is strongly influenced by classical Indian and Tibetan literature. Among the most famous of his poetic works, some that are still loved, sung and referred widely include Ulemjiin Chanar (Perfect qualities), Uvgun shuvuu (Old bird), Urhan khongor salhi (Warm breeze), Salj yadah setgel (Unbroken soul), Ichig, ichig (Shame, shame!), etc. Other notable works include:
 The ten-volume operetta Saran Khukhuu (The Story of Moon Cuckoo), which satirized corrupt individuals in the society he lived in. It is also intended to be performed for a month by over 100 actors and 60 musicians
 Yertunts Avgain Jam (The Way of the World), a pessimistic poem purportedly written as he was dying.
The songs, verses and instructions of Danzanravjaa are characterized by their strong criticism of the contemporary society of Mongolia. Being a commoner by origin, Danzanravjaa could not bear to look at the hypocrisy around him, denouncing those who "help themselves, not helping others and criticize others without criticizing themselves" as well as their apparent guise of ignorance and duplicity, and ridiculing them. On the other hand, his social satire and criticism bear the spirit of the Buddhist doctrine of anitya (impermanence).

References

Further reading
Perfect Qualities Poems of the 5th Noyon Khutagtu Danzanravjaa (1803–1856) Danzanravjaa (Author), Simon Wickham-Smith (Translator)(2006) 
Kohn, Michael Lama of the Gobi: How Mongolia's Mystic Monk Spread Tibetan Buddhism in the World's Harshest Desert, Blacksmith Books, (2010). 
List imported from: Mongol Studies, Online Reference: Danzan Ravjaa
D. Ravzhaa. Perfect Qualities : The Collected Poems of the 5th Noyon Khutagtu Danzanravjaa, (1803-1856). Ulaanbaatar, Ōngōt khévlél, 2006.
Norbu, Konchog. "'Treasures of the Sand' — The Legacy of Danzan Ravjaa." Tibetan Museum Society. Tibetan-museum-society.org. No date. Accessed 27 June 2008.

External links
Danzanravjaa Museum website 

Photo gallery, Khamar Monastery, Dornogovi, Mongolia successfully accessed on June 1, 2018.

Mongolian poets
Tulkus
Lamas
Tibetan Buddhists from Mongolia
1803 births
1856 deaths
Mongolian composers
19th-century lamas
19th-century composers
19th-century poets
Buddhist artists